The 1975 European Athletics Indoor Championships were held in 1975 in Katowice, Poland.

The track used for these championships was 160 metres long. A two-lap relay race was organised over an unusual distance of 320 metres for each leg. This was the last edition to feature relay races until 2000.

Medal summary

Men

Women

Medal table

Participating nations

 (1)
 (9)
 (19)
 (21)
 (2)
 (18)
 (9)
 (20)
 (8)
 (6)
 (5)
 (7)
 (1)
 (4)
 (3)
 (40)
 (8)
 (43)
 (7)
 (6)
 (3)
 (4)
 (25)
 (1)

External links
 Results - men at GBRathletics.com
 Results - women at GBRathletics.com
 The EAA

 
European Athletics Indoor Championships
European Indoor Championships
1975 in European sport
European Athletics Indoor Championships
Sports competitions in Katowice
International athletics competitions hosted by Poland
20th century in Katowice